

See also
 List of Jesuit sites

Schools, United States, Jesuit|Jesuit high schools in the United States
Jesuit secondary